Gwendoline van Putten School (GvP) is the sole secondary and vocational school in St. Eustatius. It offers PrO, VMBO, HAVO (Senior General Secondary Education), and MBO courses.

References

External links
 Gwendoline van Putten School

Secondary schools in the Dutch Caribbean
Education in Sint Eustatius
Buildings and structures in Sint Eustatius